This is the list of the number-one albums of the Classical Artist Albums Chart during the 2010s.

In April 2012, Noah Stewart became the first black artist ever to top the Classical Artist Albums Chart. In January 2013, In a Time Lapse by Ludovico Einaudi became the first classical album ever to sell more digital downloads than physical copies. In September 2014, Rebecca Newman became the first independent soprano to reach the top spot.

Number ones

By artist

Eighteen artists have spent six or more weeks at the top of the Classical Artist Albums Chart during the 2010s. The totals below include only credited performances.

By record label
Twenty one record labels have released chart-topping albums during the 2010s.

See also

List of UK Albums Chart number ones of the 2010s

References

External links
Classical Artist Albums Top 40 at the Official Charts Company

2010s in British music
United Kingdom Classical Artist Albums
Classical Artist